31 North 62 East is an independent psychological thriller film released in September 2009. The title refers to a point in south-western Afghanistan near Zaranj and the Iranian border.

It was written by brothers Leofwine Loraine and Tristan Loraine with the first draft of the screen play being completed on 2 May 2008. Principal photography commenced on 21 July 2008 with Tristan Loraine as director and producer.  The film cast includes John Rhys-Davies, Marina Sirtis, Heather Peace and Craig Fairbrass.

The production company was Fact Not Fiction Films and the director of photography was Sue Gibson, president of the British Society of Cinematographers (BSC).

The film music was composed by Paul Garbutt and David Leo Kemp and also includes an appearance by New Zealand born violinist/composer Fiona Pears.

Premise
A British Prime Minister gives up the position of a Special Air Service (SAS) unit in Afghanistan to ensure a UK £80 billion arms deal goes through, assuring his re-election. All soldiers in the SAS unit are thought to have died, until two months later, when one of them, a female captain, is found by Italian special forces and returns to the UK to investigate.

Cast
John Rhys-Davies ... John Hammond
Marina Sirtis ... Sarah Webber
Heather Peace ... Jill and Kimberly Mandelson
Craig Fairbrass ... Major Paul Davidson
Nathalia Ramos ...  Rachel
George Calil ...  Jacob
Dhaffer L'Abidine ...  Thierry Leroy
Ian Lavender ...  John Mandelson
Mimi Ferrer ...  Hafida
Kulvinder Ghir ...  Tariq Malim
Elaine Tan ...  Mai Li
Andrew Bicknell ...  Raymond Burton-Smith
Ian Aspinall ...  Kaleef

Filming
British filming began on 21 July 2008 in Horsham followed by various locations in West Sussex and was completed on schedule on 2 September 2008. This was  followed by Jordanian filming which was completed in late September 2008. Filming was done using digital cinematography using a 4k Thomson Viper camera recording onto HDCAM SR tape. The film then went into post production, and was released in the UK in September 2009.

Reception
Initial reception for the film was mixed.  Press screenings shown in September 2009 produced mixed reviews.
"Edgy political thriller - A film unafraid to confront the decisions made by the powers that be."
"The over all acting is poor, the characters are two dimensional leaving you with no empathy for the key players and the story line is fragmented.  One is left with the feeling that the budget should have been used on acting school for the players and training for the director rather than on helicopter and fancy car hire."

References

External links
 
 

2009 films
2009 independent films
2009 psychological thriller films
British psychological thriller films
Films about the Special Air Service
Films set in Afghanistan
Films shot in Jordan
Films shot in West Sussex
British independent films
2000s English-language films
2000s British films